Tegeticula altiplanella is a moth of the family Prodoxidae. It is found in the United States in the mountains and high plains of Colorado, southern Utah, northern Arizona and New Mexico. The habitat consists of high brush deserts, rock outcrops, volcanic tuff soils in open forests and high grassland.

The wingspan is 18-27.5 mm. The forewings are white and the hindwings are dark brownish gray.

The larvae feed on Yucca baileyi, Yucca intermedia, Yucca navajoa, Yucca standleyi, Yucca harrimaniae, Yucca gilbertiana, Yucca neomexicana, Yucca angustissima and Yucca kanabensis. They feed on developing seeds. Pupation takes place in a cocoon in the soil.

References

Moths described in 1999
Prodoxidae